The Grahame-White G.W.E.7 was a British twin-engined transport biplane, designed by M Boudot and built by Grahame-White Aviation Company at Hendon.

Development
The G.W.E.7 was a luxury transport biplane with folding wings, it seated four passengers in a cabin in the nose with the pilot behind. Powered by two  Rolls-Royce Eagle V piston engines. The only G.W.E.7, registered G-EALR was first flown in 1919. It was damaged beyond repair in a forced landing at Hendon in the same year. The damaged remains were burned in 1920.

Specifications

Notes

References

External links
 Contemporary technical description of the G.W.E.7 (here called the "Aero-Limousine") with photographs and drawings.

1910s British civil utility aircraft
Grahame-White aircraft
Biplanes
Aircraft first flown in 1919